Tsim Sha Tsui East Ferry Pier was a ferry pier in Salisbury Road, Tsim Sha Tsui East, Kowloon. The pier was firstly located outside Kowloon Shangri-La Hotel but moved to outside Grand Stanford InterContinental Hong Kong after 2000. It was closed and demolished in 2008.

Ferry service 
1986-1999
Tsim Sha Tsui East - Blake Pier / City Hall Ferry Pier (operated by Hongkong and Yaumati Ferry)
1999-2005
Tsim Sha Tsui East - Central Piers (operated by Discovery Bay Transportation Services)
2006-2008
Tsim Sha Tsui East - City Hall Ferry Pier / Central Piers (operated by Hoi You Ferry)

References

2000 establishments in Hong Kong
2008 disestablishments in Hong Kong
Demolished piers in Hong Kong
Tsim Sha Tsui East
Victoria Harbour